Eas Chia-aig is a waterfall on the Abhainn Chia-aig, in the Highlands of Scotland. The falls are located between Loch Lochy and Loch Arkaig, near Achnacarry and Clunes.

See also
Waterfalls of Scotland

References

Waterfalls of Highland (council area)